Karnobat Pass (Karnobatski Prohod \kar-no-'bat-ski 'pro-hod\) is a 220 m wide and 720 m high pass in Levski Ridge in Tangra Mountains, Livingston Island in the South Shetland Islands, Antarctica. It is bounded by Helmet Peak to the south and Intuition Peak to the north, and is situated 5.46 km east of Lozen Saddle and 5.86 km southeast of Pirdop Gate. The pass provides overland access from Devnya Valley to Iskar Glacier area.  It was named after the town of Karnobat in eastern Bulgaria.

Location

Maps
 L.L. Ivanov et al. Antarctica: Livingston Island and Greenwich Island, South Shetland Islands. Scale 1:100000 topographic map. Sofia: Antarctic Place-names Commission of Bulgaria, 2005.
 L.L. Ivanov. Antarctica: Livingston Island and Greenwich, Robert, Snow and Smith Islands. Scale 1:120000 topographic map.  Troyan: Manfred Wörner Foundation, 2009.

References
 Karnobat Pass. SCAR Composite Antarctic Gazetteer
 Bulgarian Antarctic Gazetteer. Antarctic Place-names Commission. (details in Bulgarian, basic data in English)

External links
 Karnobat Pass. Copernix satellite image

Tangra Mountains